Omandesep (also spelled Omanesep) is a village in Asmat Regency, South Papua, Indonesia. Omandesep is situated to the south of the villages of Agats and Atsy.

References

Villages in South Papua
Asmat Regency